Andalusian Coalition–Andalusian Power was an Andalusian electoral alliance created for the 1994 European Parliament and Andalusian regional elections. It was composed by the Andalusian Party and the Andalusian Progress Party.

Composition

Defunct political party alliances in Spain
Political parties in Andalusia
Political parties established in 1994
Political parties disestablished in 1994